The FIBA Oceania Women's Championship was the women's basketball continental championship of Oceania, played biennially under the auspices of the Fédération Internationale de Basketball, the basketball sport governing body, and the Oceanian zone thereof.  The tournament also serves to qualify teams for participation in the quadrennial FIBA World Championship for Women and the Olympic basketball tournament.

Beginning in 2017, all FIBA continental championships for women will be held on a two-year cycle, and the continental championships will be part of the qualifying process for either the World Cup or Olympics. The 2015 Oceanian Championships were the last Oceanian Championships to ever be held as starting 2017, the tournament will merge with the FIBA Asia Championship to give way for the FIBA Asia-Pacific Championship

Summaries
Results highlighted in blue were Olympic qualifiers, those which are not were World Championship qualifiers.

As host nation for the 2000 Olympic Games in Sydney, Australia automatically qualified for the Olympics, and did not compete in 1999. New Zealand were scheduled to play American Samoa, but American Samoa withdrew, meaning the 1999 tournament was scratched and New Zealand were awarded the championship, becoming the FIBA Oceania qualifier for the 2000 Sydney Olympics.

Medal table

Participating nations

See also

References

External links
 

 
    
Oceanian championships
Recurring sporting events established in 1974
Recurring sporting events disestablished in 2015